Seam may refer to:

Science and technology
 Seam (geology), a stratum of coal or mineral that is economically viable; a bed or a distinct layer of vein of rock in other layers of rock
 Seam (metallurgy), a metalworking process the joins the ends of two sheet metal edges
 Seam (sewing), the line where two or more layers of fabric are held together by stitches.
Seam (unit), various obsolete units of measurement
 Can seamer, a machine used to seal a lid to a can body, such as in paint or food cans
 JBoss Seam, a Java application framework by JBoss
 Seam carving, an image resizing algorithm
 Sun Enterprise Authentication Mechanism, or SEAM, an implementation of Kerberos protocol for the Solaris operating system

Sports
 Quarter seam, a thread on the surface of a cricket ball
 Seam bowling, in cricket, refers to bowling with the main seam upright
 Seam route, a passing route in football

Other uses
 Seam (band), an indie rock band from Chicago, Illinois
 SEAM, the ICAO airport code for Chachoan Airport in Ambato, Ecuador
 Seam, a character from the video game Deltarune

See also
 SEAMS
 Seamless (disambiguation)
Seem (disambiguation)
Seim (disambiguation)